The Grand Cross of the Iron Cross was a decoration intended for victorious generals of the Prussian Army and its allies. It was the second highest class of the Iron Cross, following the Star of the Grand Cross of the Iron Cross, which was awarded only twice. Along with the Iron Cross 1st and 2nd Class, the Grand Cross was founded on 10 March 1813, during the Napoleonic Wars. It was renewed in 1870 for the Franco-Prussian War and again in 1914 for World War I. In 1939, when Adolf Hitler renewed the Iron Cross as a German (rather than strictly Prussian) decoration, he also renewed the Grand Cross.

The Grand Cross of the Iron Cross was twice the size of the Iron Cross and was worn from a ribbon around the neck. The later Knight's Cross of the Iron Cross, instituted in 1939, was also worn from the neck; it was smaller than the Grand Cross but larger than the Iron Cross.

1813 Grand Cross

Five men received the 1813 Grand Cross of the Iron Cross for actions during the Napoleonic Wars:

 Gebhard Leberecht von Blücher, commander of Prussian forces at the Battle of Waterloo, later also awarded the Star of the Grand Cross of the Iron Cross
 Friedrich Wilhelm von Bülow
 Crown Prince Charles John of Sweden (Jean-Baptiste Bernadotte) - earlier a Marshal under Napoleon, after becoming regent and crown prince of Sweden, he joined the Sixth Coalition against Napoleon.
 Bogislav Friedrich Emanuel von Tauentzien
 Ludwig Yorck von Wartenburg

1870 Grand Cross

The Iron Cross was renewed on 19 July 1870, for the Franco-Prussian War.  Nine men received the 1870 Grand Cross of the Iron Cross for service during that war. Seven Grand Crosses were awarded on 22 March 1871, to:

 Crown Prince Albert of Saxony
 August Karl von Goeben
 Edwin Freiherr von Manteuffel
 Helmuth Graf von Moltke the Elder
 Prince Frederick Charles of Prussia
 Crown Prince Friedrich Wilhelm of Prussia (later Kaiser Friedrich III)
 August Graf von Werder

Kaiser Wilhelm I received the Grand Cross on 16 June 1871, and Friedrich Franz II, Grand Duke of Mecklenburg-Schwerin, received it on 4 December 1871.  The Kaiser was supreme commander of the Prussian Army, and Moltke was Chief of the General Staff. The others were senior combat commanders of the Prussian Army (Crown Prince Albert initially commanded the Saxon Army as a corps under a Prussian field army, but later took command of a combined Prussian/Saxon field army).

1914 Grand Cross

The Iron Cross was renewed again on 5 August 1914.  There were five recipients of the 1914 Grand Cross in the First World War:
 Kaiser Wilhelm II
 Paul von Hindenburg, later also awarded the Star of the Grand Cross of the Iron Cross
 Erich Ludendorff
 Prince Leopold of Bavaria
 August von Mackensen

1939 Grand Cross

Adolf Hitler reinstituted the Iron Cross as a German decoration in September 1939, with the Grand Cross again the highest grade (above the various classes of the Knight's Cross).

Hermann Göring became the only recipient of the Grand Cross of the Iron Cross during World War II when it was awarded to him on 19 July 1940 for his role as the Supreme Commander of the Luftwaffe who led them to victory in the French campaign.  

A World War II version of the higher Star of the Grand Cross of the Iron Cross was devised, but never formally instituted or awarded. Following the Allied victory in May 1945, the United States Army seized the only known prototype, which is now a part of the collection of the Museum of the United States Military Academy (USMA) in West Point, New York.

References

External links

Military awards and decorations of Prussia
Military awards and decorations of Nazi Germany
1813 establishments in Prussia
Awards established in 1914
Awards established in 1939
1870 establishments in Prussia
1914 establishments in Germany
1939 establishments in Germany
Awards established in 1813